Aulandra is a genus of plant in the family Sapotaceae endemic to Borneo.  the World Checklist of Selected Plant Families recognises 3 species:

 Aulandra beccarii (Pierre ex Dubard) P.Royen
 Aulandra cauliflora H.J.Lam
 Aulandra longifolia H.J.Lam

References

 
Sapotaceae genera
Endemic flora of Borneo
Trees of Borneo